Austrian heraldry are the armorial bearings (known as armory) and other heraldic symbols once used by the Austrian monarchy. They are closely related to German heraldry, as Austria is a Germanophone country, but it show some particularities of their own, partly due to the mutual influence to and from the lands of the former Habsburg monarchy.

External links
an overview of Austrian civic heraldry (>2000 arms)